The Kilkenny county hurling team represents Kilkenny in hurling and is governed by Kilkenny GAA, the county board of the Gaelic Athletic Association. The team competes in the three major annual inter-county competitions; the All-Ireland Senior Hurling Championship, the Leinster Senior Hurling Championship and the National Hurling League.

Kilkenny's home ground is Nowlan Park, Kilkenny. The team's manager is Derek Lyng.

The team last won the Leinster Senior Championship in 2022, the All-Ireland Senior Championship in 2015 and the National League in 2021.

History
Kilkenny is the most successful county team at senior level in the history of the game of hurling. Kilkenny has won the All-Ireland Championship 36 times and has won the provincial Leinster Championship on 73 occasions as of 2021.

Beginning of the modern era

In 1922, Kilkenny won its sixteenth Leinster title before later lining out in the All-Ireland final against Tipperary. In an exciting game, Tipperary were winning by three points with three minutes remaining, but Kilkenny fought back to score two goals to secure the victory. It would be forty-five years before Kilkenny would beat Tipperary in the championship again. Further Leinster titles soon followed. In 1926, Kilkenny faced Cork on a snow-covered Croke Park in the All-Ireland final. However, victory on that occasion went to 'the Rebels'.
The 1930s proved to be one of Kilkenny's most successful decades, book-ended by two of the most famous All-Ireland finals of all-time. The 1930s saw 'the Cats' battle it out with Limerick for the title of team of the decade. In 1931, Kilkenny were back as Leinster champions before squaring up to Cork in the All-Ireland final. At half-time Cork led. However, Kilkenny fought back to secure a draw. The replay saw Lory Meagher give one of his most outstanding displays on the hurling field. Once again Cork led at half-time. However, Kilkenny fought back to force a second draw. In the third game of the series Kilkenny were without the services of Meagher. On that occasion Cork secured the victory by seven points. 1932 saw Kilkenny back in the All-Ireland final. Clare, surprise winners in Munster, provided the opposition. In an eventful game 'the Cats' won by a goal and claimed their first championship in a decade. The following year Kilkenny were back in their third successive championship decider, this time against Limerick. Once again, the game was a close affair; however, Kilkenny won to seal back-to-back All-Ireland titles.

In 1935, Kilkenny regained their Leinster crown before lining out in the All-Ireland final. Limerick provided the opposition once again. In a close game Kilkenny beat the Munster men by a single point. 1936 saw an All-Ireland rematch between Kilkenny and Limerick. However, on this occasion Limerick had the measure of 'the Cats' and trounced them by 5–6 to 1–5. The following year Kilkenny had a chance to redeem themselves in their third consecutive championship decider. This time Tipperary were the opponent. However, Kilkenny collapsed on the day and gave Tipp a seventeen-point victory. This looked like the end for the great Kilkenny team of the 1930s. However, two years later in 1939 the team was back in the All-Ireland final. On the day that the Second World War broke out 'the Cats' took on Cork at Croke Park. Both sides were level throughout much of the game, the climax of which was played in a fierce thunderstorm. Terry Leahy was the hero for Kilkenny as he scored the winning point in the dying seconds of the game. Kilkenny were back in the championship decider again in 1940, their fifth in six years. On this occasion an ageing Limerick team faced an ageing Kilkenny team, but it was the Munster men who won.

Kilkenny were forced to withdraw from the championship in the early 1940s because of an outbreak of foot-and-mouth disease in the county. They regained the Leinster title in 1943, but Antrim pulled off the biggest hurling shock of all-time by defeating 'the Cats' in the All-Ireland semi-final. Two years later in 1945, Kilkenny faced Tipperary in the All-Ireland final. The Munster men led by a large margin at half-time; Kilkenny fought back but it was not enough to deny Tipp. In 1946, Kilkenny were back in the championship decider, this time taking on Cork. The first-half saw both sides trade the lead on several occasions. However, in the second half Cork scored five goals to deny Kilkenny for the second consecutive occasion. The Cork-Kilkenny rematch took place in the 1947 All-Ireland final, a game many describe as the greatest championship decider of all time. Cork were aiming to win a sixth All-Ireland title in seven years, while Kilkenny were hoping to avoid being the first team in history to lose three consecutive All-Ireland finals. 'The Cats' were leading for much of the game. However, Cork scored two late goals to nearly win the match. Terry Leahy scored the winning point once again for Kilkenny to give the county its thirteenth All-Ireland title.

Lean years
The All-Ireland victory in 1947 ushered in a lean period in Kilkenny hurling that lasted for over a decade. 1950 saw 'the Cats' win back the Leinster title. However, they were later beaten by Tipperary in the championship decider as the Munster men completed the second leg of a famous three-in-a-row. Three years later in 1953, Kilkenny were Leinster champions again. However, Galway accounted for them in the All-Ireland semi-final. Four years later in 1957, Kilkenny were provincial masters once again. The subsequent All-Ireland final saw 'the Cats' take on Waterford for the first time in championship history. The men from the Déise led with fifteen minutes left in the match. However, Kilkenny fought back to win by 4–10 to 3–12.

Kilkenny retained the Leinster Cup in 1958. However, in a change to the format of the championship, they were beaten by Tipperary in the All-Ireland semi-final. A third consecutive Leinster title was captured in 1959. However, the All-Ireland final against Waterford ended in a draw. The replay saw a young Eddie Keher make his debut. However, victory went to Waterford. A National League victory in 1962 gave Kilkenny the impetus to recapture the provincial trophy in 1963. In the All-Ireland final, Waterford fought back from being 11-points down. However, 'the Cats' won by two points. Victory in the Leinster final in 1964 allowed Kilkenny a straight passage into the All-Ireland final where they were  favourites to retain the title. However, Tipperary hammered Kilkenny off the field with a fourteen-point victory. Two years later in 1966 Kilkenny won the National League once again. This was followed by another provincial title and an appearance in the championship decider. Once again, Kilkenny were favourites over a youthful Cork side. However, youth trumped experience as Cork emerged as the victors. 1967 saw Kilkenny win another Leinster title before lining out in their fourth All-Ireland final of the decade. An ageing Tipp team provided the opposition; however, Kilkenny got goals at vital times and secured a famous victory. It was Kilkenny's first triumph over Tipp in the championship since 1923.

Greatest team of all time?

Many supporters of Kilkenny hurling regard the Kilkenny teams from 1969 until 1975 as being the greatest of all-time. That team featured such star players as Eddie Keher, Dick O'Hara, Ollie Walsh, Noel Skehan, Frank Cummins, Fan Larkin and Pat Henderson to name but a few. 1969 saw Kilkenny wrest the Leinster title back from Wexford and qualify for an All-Ireland final appearance against Cork. After the surprise defeat in 1966 Kilkenny were out for revenge. The game ended in 'the Cats' favour on a score line of 2–15 to 2–9. Wexford recaptured the Leinster title in 1970. However, Kilkenny bounced back with a team that won five consecutive provincial titles between 1971 and 1975. The team also made five consecutive All-Ireland final appearances during those years, a record which stood till 2011.

In 1971, Kilkenny faced Tipperary in the championship decider. In the first final broadcast in colour by RTÉ, Eddie Keher scored a record 2 goals and 11 points; however, he still ended up on the losing side as Tipp won on a score line of 5–17 to 5–14. 1972 saw the only 80-minute final between Kilkenny and Cork. Cork were in firm control in the second half and were eight points ahead. However, Kilkenny upped the ante and won the game by seven points. It was a remarkable fifteen-point turnaround in one of the all-time classic games. In 1973, Kilkenny squared up to Limerick in the championship decider for the first time since 1940. Injury, illness and emigration saw a depleted Kilkenny team take on the Munster champions and lose their status as All-Ireland champions. 1974 saw a Kilkenny-Limerick rematch. Limerick stormed into an early lead. However, 'the Cats' goal power secured a 12-point win. In 1975, Kilkenny took on a Galway side that had stunned Cork in the All-Ireland semi-final. Galway led at half-time. However, the Kilkenny men fought back and secured a 12-point victory once again.

By the time the team won their next Leinster title in 1978, the great team of the early 1970s was breaking up. Kilkenny played Cork in that year's All-Ireland final. However, the Munster champions were too good for an ageing Kilkenny side and duly captured their third championship in-a-row. 1979 saw an injection of new blood into the team as Kilkenny won their seventh provincial title of the decade. The side later took on and defeated Galway in one of the least memorable finals of the decade.

1980s and 1990s
The early 1980s saw the great Kilkenny team of the 1970s break up as Offaly emerged as a new force in Leinster. 'The Cats' fought back in 1982 by capturing the National League and the Leinster title. Christy Heffernan's two goals in a forty-second spell gave Kilkenny a victory over Cork in the subsequent All-Ireland final. In 1983, Kilkenny completed what they call 'the double-double' as they captured back-to-back League, Leinster and All-Ireland honours. Cork were defeated once again in the championship decider. Kilkenny's hopes of capturing the three-in-a-row were dashed in the provincial championship of 1984.

Two years later in 1986, 'the Cats' captured the National League before reclaiming the Leinster championship title from Offaly, although the team were defeated by Galway in the All-Ireland semi-final. 1987 saw Kilkenny retain their Leinster crown before lining out in another All-Ireland final. An in-form Galway side defeated Kilkenny in a low-scoring encounter. The next three years saw Kilkenny once again cast out into the hurling wilderness. However, the legendary goalkeeper Ollie Walsh took over as manager at the turn of the decade. A National League title in 1990 was followed by a Leinster title and an All-Ireland final appearance in 1991. Ultimately though, like they had done so many times in the past, Tipperary defeated Kilkenny, twenty years on since their last meeting, to win the final. In 1992, Kilkenny retained their Leinster crown before lining out in the All-Ireland championship decider against Cork. The team played into a strong wind in the first-half. However, they emerged as the victors on a scoreline of 3–10 to 1–12. A third consecutive Leinster title was collected in 1993 before 'the Cats' made a third consecutive All-Ireland final appearance. On that occasion Kilkenny retained the Liam MacCarthy Cup by a margin of five points.

Offaly and Wexford reigned supreme in Leinster for the next four years. However, Kilkenny won another National League title in 1995.

Brian Cody era

Nickey Brennan guided the Kilkenny senior hurlers for two seasons in the mid-1990s. However, he had little success. His successor, Kevin Fennelly, brought the county back to their winning ways by capturing a Leinster title in 1998 at the expense of Offaly GAA. Offaly later gained their revenge by defeating ‘the Cats’ in the All-Ireland final. Fennelly, in turn, was succeeded by Brian Cody, one of the most successful managers of the modern era, much of his success due to skill, organisation, work-rate and a never say die attitude.

1999–2003
In 1999, Cody guided Kilkenny to a second consecutive Leinster title and a second consecutive All-Ireland final appearance. Cork GAA provided the opposition on that occasion. However, in atrocious weather conditions, Kilkenny were denied once again. In 2000 Kilkenny eased to another Leinster title and a third successive All-Ireland final. The prospect of becoming the first side in history to lose three successive championship deciders was a huge motivating factor. In the end Kilkenny trounced Offaly to take the title. Another Leinster title was added to the collection in 2001 before ‘the Cats’ annexed a National Hurling League title in 2002. As Kilkenny began to assert their dominance on the hurling world the team later captured another set of Leinster and All-Ireland titles. In 2003, Kilkenny completed what they call 'the double-double' as they captured back-to-back League, Leinster and All-Ireland honours.

2004–2005
In 2004, Kilkenny were aiming to capture an elusive third All-Ireland title in-a-row. The plan came unstuck in the Leinster championship when Wexford brought Kilkenny's provincial championship run of success to an end. 'The Cats' later reached the All-Ireland final; however, Cork pounced and defeated their arch-rivals. 2005 started well with Cody's side winning National League and Leinster honours. However, their season ended with a defeat by Galway in the All-Ireland semi-final.

2006–2011
The following year Kilkenny retained their National League and Leinster titles before reaching the championship decider yet again. Cork, who were attempting to capture their own three-in-a-row, provided the opposition; however, victory went to a superior Kilkenny side. In 2007, 'the Cats' won an unprecedented ninth Leinster title from ten campaigns. They later reached the All-Ireland final where they defeated Limerick to win their thirtieth championship title. In 2008, they won the Leinster title before defeating Waterford in the All-Ireland final. This team has been called the best team ever to play the sport. Later in the year Kilkenny went on to win the All-Ireland Under-21 Hurling Championship. Combined with the All-Ireland Minor Hurling Championship title, the All-Ireland Intermediate Hurling Championship title (which is broadly a competition for the second string county teams) and of course the senior title: this marks a quadruple. The achievement was unique and marks a high point in the dominance of hurling by Kilkenny teams. In 2009, Kilkenny's dominance was lessened and it was suggested that they were entering a decline. They saw off an emerging Dublin side in the Leinster final thanks to two goals from Martin Comerford. Nevertheless, they reached the final and after a titanic battle with old rivals Tipperary which included a controversial penalty being awarded towards the end of the game, Kilkenny secured a four-in-a-row with a five-point win over Tipperary, who mounted a formidable challenge to their crown in an absorbing final which made up for the mis-matches of the two previous years when only token resistance was presented by Limerick and Waterford. Kilkenny became the first team since Cork in the 1940s to do the four-in-a-row.

In 2010, Kilkenny defeated Galway to claim their twelfth Leinster title. They later reached the All-Ireland final where they faced the previous year's opponents Tipperary. However, it was different from 2009 as Tipperary's Lar Corbett tore through Kilkenny's full-back line with a hat trick of goals to deny Kilkenny the 5 in a row and a unique piece of hurling championship history. It was also Kilkenny's third defeat in an All-Ireland final under Cody and Kilkenny's 12th final loss to Tipperary in total.

In 2011, Kilkenny faced Tipperary for the third consecutive final. Kilkenny regained the All-Ireland title by defeating Tipperary 2–17 to 1–16.

2012–2013
Galway defeated Kilkenny in the 2012 Leinster Senior Hurling Championship Final. Kilkenny bounced back beating Limerick and winning over Tipperary by double scores 4–24 to 1–15. Kilkenny then met Galway in the All-Ireland Final, and when Joe Canning scored the last point of the game, he forced a replay (the first since 1959). However Kilkenny won the replayed All-Ireland Final on a scoreline of 3–22 to 3–11, their ninth success in thirteen championship seasons.

Kilkenny got off to a good start in 2013, winning their 17th National Hurling League title beating Tipperary in the final. In the 2013 Leinster Senior Hurling Championship, Kilkenny succumbed to defeat by an improving Dublin side in the semi-final. Dublin were eventual winners in Leinster defeating Galway in the 2013 Leinster Senior Hurling Championship Final. Kilkenny were drawn against their fierce rivals Tipperary in the second round of the qualifiers. This game was a unique occasion as it marked the first time since the 1937 All-Ireland Senior Hurling Championship Final that the two sides had met outside Croke Park in the Championship. The hot summer weather added to the electric atmosphere at Nowlan Park as Kilkenny went on to beat Tipperary. This would prove to be the highlight for Kilkenny's season as they scraped a victory over Waterford after extra time and were beaten by old foes Cork at the quarter final stage in Semple Stadium. This was the first time Kilkenny failed to make the semi-final stage since the 1996 All-Ireland Senior Hurling Championship with many signaling an end to Kilkenny's dominance.

2014–2018
Kilkenny recovered in 2014. Many had doubts over the team following a change in the guard in 2013. However, Kilkenny went on to claim the 2014 Walsh Cup, the 2014 National Hurling League, the 2014 Leinster Senior Hurling Championship and their 35th 2014 All-Ireland Senior Hurling Championship. Brian Cody became the first manager in GAA history to win 10 Senior All-Ireland titles while Henry Shefflin became the first player in GAA history to win 10 Senior All-Ireland titles. The year was topped of when Richie Hogan picked up the GPA Hurler of the Year award.

The 2015 season saw Kilkenny claim both the Leinster and All-Ireland title once again. Kilkenny pulled off a fantastic second half performance in the All-Ireland Final to see off Galway. It was Kilkenny's 36th All-Ireland win and the 11th under manager Brian Cody. The achievement was even more significant following a number of high-profile retirements at the end of the previous season.

In 2016, Kilkenny were beaten by Tipperary in the All Ireland Final with a score line of 2–29 to 2-20. Tipperary scoring 2-29 (35 points) is the highest score scored against Kilkenny while Brian Cody has been in charge.

The 2017 season began promising for Kilkenny by claiming the 2017 Walsh Cup, Davy Fitzgerald's Wexford ended Kilkenny's participation in the National League at the quarter-final stage and when the teams met in the Leinster Championship semi final it was Wexford's first championship victory over Kilkenny since 2004. Waterford met Kilkenny in the second round of the All-Ireland Qualifiers and after a period of extra time it was Waterford who pushed on to victory. This was Waterford's first championship win over Kilkenny since the 1959 All-Ireland Final Replay.

The 2018 season began very interesting with a 2018 Walsh Cup final appearance with Wexford ending in a first ever free scoring competition narrowly won by the 'Model county'. Attentions turned to the National Hurling league soon after and, after a shaky start, Kilkenny went from strength to strength and defeated Tipperary in a pulsating final contest by 2–23 to 2–17. The newly formed round robin Leinster Championship proved to be hugely successful and Kilkenny qualified for a meeting with rivals Galway in the Leinster Final. 'The Tribesmen' got the better of 'the Cats' after a replay in Semple Stadium, Thurles. The following week Kilkenny were pitted against the soon to be All-Ireland Champions Limerick in a titanic battle, with Eoin Murphy on goal keeping the Cats hopes alive with outstanding blocking skills and after a Richie Hogan goal late in the second half looked to have turned the tide for Kilkenny it was Limericks young talent who finished the game strongly on a scoreline of 0–27 to 1-22. An exciting and busy Championship 2018 ended for Kilkenny in a determined and hopeful fashion with the 2019 season already promising an ever improving and interesting prospect.

2019–2022
Kilkenny failed to reach the knockout stages of the National Hurling League. They finished top of the Leinster Championship round robin earning them a Leinster Final spot with Wexford. They were defeated by Wexford by 1–23 to 0–23 in the final. Kilkenny then had wins over Cork and All Ireland Champions Limerick in the quarter and semi finals respectively. These results earned them an All-Ireland Final spot against great rivals Tipperary and their returning 2010 management team who went on to win the title, hammering Kilkenny on a scoreline of 3–25 to 0-20.

Kilkenny qualified for the 2022 All-Ireland Senior Hurling Championship Final but lost, giving Limerick three consecutive All-Ireland SHC titles.

On the afternoon of 23 July 2022, Cody's resignation as manager was announced. He had been in the role for 24 years.

Post-Cody
The Kilkenny County Board ratified Derek Lyng as Kilkenny senior hurling team manager on the night of 4 August 2022.

Rivalries
 Galway–Kilkenny hurling rivalry
 Kilkenny–Tipperary hurling rivalry
 Cork-Kilkenny hurling rivalry
 Kilkenny-Wexford hurling rivalry
 Kilkenny-Limerick hurling rivalry
 Kilkenny-Waterford hurling rivalry

Current panel

INJ Player has had an injury which has affected recent involvement with the county team.
RET Player has since retired from the county team.
WD Player has since withdrawn from the county team due to a non-injury issue.

2022 New Kilkenny Players

Goalkeepers
Liam Dunphy Lisdowney

Defenders/Midfielders
Mikey Butler O'Loughlin Gaels
James Burke Thomastown
Niall MacMahon Erin's Own
David Blanchfield Bennettsbridge
Conor Heary O'Loughlin Gaels
Shane Murphy Glenmore
Niall Brassil James Stephens
Niall Brennan Lisdowney
Tomás Dunne Tullaroan

Forwards
Colm Prenderville Graigue Ballycallan
Emmet Landy Windgap
Sean Morrissey Bennettsbridge
Chris Bolger Clara
Shane Walsh Tullaroan
Matt Kenny Clara
Cian Kenny James Stephens
John Walsh Mullinavat

Substitutes (used, non playing etc.)
Darragh O'Keeffe Thomastown
Aaron Brennan Lisdowney
Eoin O'Shea O'Loughlin Gaels
Stephen Donnelly Thomastown
Robbie Buckley O'Loughlin Gaels
Evan Cody Dicksboro
Tadhg O'Dwyer James Stephens

2023 New Kilkenny Players

Goalkeepers
Aidan Tallis Lisdowney

Defenders/Midfielders
Niall Rowe Dicksboro
Niall Mullins James Stephens
Des Dunne Danesfort
Peter McDonald Thomastown

Forwards
Ian Byrne Glenmore
Billy Drennan Galmoy

Substitutes (used, non playing etc.)
Pádraic Moylan Dicksboro
Bill Sheehan Dicksboro
Paul Cody Clara
Daire O'Neill Danesfort
Shane Staunton Clara
Gearóid Dunne Tullaroan

Current management team
Manager: Derek Lyng (Emeralds), announced for a three-year term on 4 August 2022
Selectors: Peter Barry (James Stephens)
Other backroom: Michael Rice (Carrickshock), Peter O'Donovan, Conor Phelan
Strength and conditioning coaches: Mickey Comerford and John Murphy

Managerial history

Kilkenny — like Cork and Tipperary — traditionally appoints managers from inside, rather than seeking a "foreign" appointment.

Players

Notable players

Records
All-time top scorer All-Ireland Senior Hurling Championship (2010–2021): Henry Shefflin – 27–484 (565 pts)
Last outfield hurler to play without a helmet in All-Ireland SHC final: Michael Kavanagh in 2009

Most appearances

Top scorers

Most All-Ireland SHC medals

All Stars

Kilkenny has 193 All Stars, as of 28 October 2022.
Cú Chulainn Awards 22
1963 (3), 1964 (7), 1965 (1), 1966 (4), 1967 (7)
GAA All Stars Awards 193
1971 (4), 1972 (6), 1973 (7), 1974 (7), 1975 (6), 1976 (3), 1978 (3), 1979 (4), 1982 (8), 1983 (9), 1984 (2), 1985 (1), 1986 (1), 1987 (3), 1990 (1), 1991 (2), 1992 (7), 1993 (6), 1994 (1), 1995 (1), 1997 (3), 1998 (2), 1999 (4), 2000 (9), 2001 (1), 2002 (7), 2003 (8), 2004 (3), 2005 (2), 2006 (6), 2007 (6), 2008 (9), 2009 (6), 2010 (5), 2011 (8), 2012 (5), 2014 (6), 2015 (7), 2016 (4), 2018 (1), 2019 (3), 2020 (1), 2021 (1), 2022 (4)

Team records
Most All-Ireland Senior Hurling Championship titles: 36
Longest unbeaten Hurling Championship run: 21 games (10 June 2006 to 8 August 2010)
Highest score in All-Ireland Senior Hurling Championship final: 3–30 (2008 v Waterford) [tied Cork 1970]
Most National Hurling League titles: 19 [tied with Tipperary]
Most All-Ireland Under-21 Hurling Championship titles: 12 
Most All-Ireland Minor Hurling Championship titles: 21
Most Provincial Senior Hurling Championship titles: 73
Most Provincial Intermediate Hurling Championship titles: 17
Most Provincial Under-21/Under-20 Hurling Championship titles: 26
Most Provincial Minor Hurling Championship titles: 56
Most GAA All Stars Awards: 193

Honours

National
All-Ireland Senior Hurling Championship
 Winners (36): 1904, 1905, 1907, 1909, 1911, 1912, 1913, 1922, 1932, 1933, 1935, 1939, 1947, 1957, 1963, 1967, 1969, 1972, 1974, 1975, 1979, 1982, 1983, 1992, 1993, 2000, 2002, 2003, 2006, 2007, 2008, 2009, 2011, 2012, 2014, 2015
 Runners-up (28): 1893, 1895, 1897, 1898, 1916, 1926, 1931, 1936, 1937, 1940, 1945, 1946, 1950, 1959, 1964, 1966, 1971, 1973, 1978, 1987, 1991, 1998, 1999, 2004, 2010, 2016, 2019, 2022
National Hurling League
 Winners (19): 1932–33, 1961–62, 1965–66, 1975–76, 1981–82, 1982–83, 1985–86, 1989–90, 1994–95, 2002, 2003, 2005, 2006, 2009, 2012, 2013, 2014, 2018, 2021 (shared)
 Runners-up (11): 1946–47, 1949–50, 1953–54, 1956–57, 1964–65, 1966–67, 1967–68, 1976–77, 1977–78, 2007, 2011
All-Ireland Intermediate Hurling Championship
 Winners (5): 1973, 2008, 2010, 2016, 2017
All-Ireland Junior Hurling Championship
 Winners (9): 1928, 1946, 1951, 1956, 1984, 1986, 1988, 1990, 1995
All-Ireland Under-21 Hurling Championship
 Winners (12): 1974, 1975, 1977, 1984, 1990, 1994, 1999, 2003, 2004, 2006, 2008, 2022
All-Ireland Minor Hurling Championship
 Winners (21):1931, 1935, 1936, 1950, 1960, 1961, 1962, 1972, 1973, 1975, 1977, 1981, 1988, 1990, 1991, 1993, 2002, 2003, 2008, 2010, 2014
All-Ireland Vocational Schools Championship
 Winners (8): 1963, 1972, 1973, 1975, 1976, 1977, 1989, 1991

Provincial
Leinster Senior Hurling Championship
 Winners (74): 1888, 1893, 1895, 1897, 1898, 1900, 1903, 1904, 1905, 1907, 1909, 1911, 1912, 1913, 1916, 1922, 1923, 1925, 1926, 1931, 1932, 1933, 1935, 1936, 1937, 1939, 1940, 1943, 1945, 1946, 1947, 1950, 1953, 1957, 1958, 1959, 1963, 1964, 1966, 1967, 1969, 1971, 1972, 1973, 1974, 1975, 1978, 1979, 1982, 1983, 1986, 1987, 1991, 1992, 1993, 1998, 1999, 2000, 2001, 2002, 2003, 2005, 2006, 2007, 2008, 2009, 2010, 2011, 2014, 2015, 2016, 2020, 2021, 2022
 Runners-up (31): 1896, 1902, 1906, 1908, 1914, 1917, 1919, 1920, 1921, 1927, 1934, 1938, 1941, 1942, 1949, 1955, 1956, 1960, 1962, 1965, 1968, 1970, 1976, 1977, 1980, 1989, 1995, 1997, 2012, 2018, 2019
Kehoe Cup:
 Winners (1): 1980
Walsh Cup
 Winners (20): 1955, 1957, 1958, 1959, 1961, 1962, 1963, 1970, 1973, 1974, 1988, 1989, 1992, 2005, 2006, 2007, 2009, 2012, 2014, 2017
Leinster Intermediate Hurling Championship
 Winners (17): 1967, 1973, 1997, 1998, 1999, 2000, 2003, 2004, 2006, 2008, 2009, 2010, 2011, 2012, 2013, 2016, 2017
Leinster Junior Hurling Championship
 Winners (25): 1909, 1911, 1913, 1916, 1928, 1930, 1935, 1939, 1941, 1946, 1949, 1951, 1956, 1958, 1983, 1984, 1986, 1988, 1989, 1990, 1991, 1993, 1994, 1995, 1996
Leinster Under-21 Hurling Championship
 Winners (26): 1968, 1974, 1975, 1976, 1977, 1980, 1981, 1982, 1984, 1985, 1988, 1990, 1993, 1994, 1995, 1998, 1999, 2003, 2004, 2005, 2006, 2008, 2009, 2012, 2017, 2019, 2022
Leinster Minor Hurling Championship
 Winners (58): 1930, 1931, 1932, 1933, 1935, 1936, 1937, 1939, 1942, 1948, 1949, 1950, 1951, 1955, 1956, 1957, 1958, 1959, 1960, 1961, 1962, 1969, 1971, 1972, 1973, 1974, 1975, 1976, 1977, 1978, 1979, 1981, 1982, 1984, 1988, 1990, 1991, 1992, 1993, 1994, 1995, 1996, 1997, 1998, 1999, 2001, 2002, 2003, 2004, 2006, 2008, 2009, 2010, 2014, 2015, 2017, 2020, 2021

Other
Players Champions Cup
 Winners (1): 2019

References

 
County hurling teams